Sir Walter Raleigh (c. 1554 – 29 October 1618) was an English gentleman, writer, poet, soldier, courtier, spy, and explorer, well known for popularising tobacco in England.

Art, entertainment, and media

Films
Vincent Price portrayed Raleigh in The Private Lives of Elizabeth and Essex (1939). The cast also included Bette Davis and Errol Flynn.
Leslie Bradley portrayed Raleigh in the comedy Time Flies (1944).
Richard Todd portrayed Raleigh in the film, The Virgin Queen (1955).
Edward Everett Horton portrayed Sir Walter Raleigh in the film The Story of Mankind (1957).
 The Historie of the World, of which only the first volume was completed before Raleigh's execution, is the source of the title of the Mel Brooks comedy film History of the World, Part I (1981).
 He is portrayed by Clive Owen in Elizabeth: The Golden Age (2007). Elizabeth "Bess" Throckmorton, portrayed by Abbie Cornish, was also a featured character in this sequel to Elizabeth (1998), which focuses on the relationships of Elizabeth I (portrayed by Cate Blanchett) and Bess with Raleigh, and shows Bess and Raleigh marrying prior to the Spanish Armada (1588), though in fact the couple married in 1591.

Games
Raleigh is a playable character in the video game Jamestown.
Raleigh is the default character of England in the Microprose game Sid Meier's Colonization.

Literature
According to 1066 and All That, James I, with his "logical and tidy mind" had Raleigh executed "for being left over from the previous reign."
He is one of the principal characters in Winston Graham's historical novel The Grove of Eagles (1963).
He is a character in Gloriana's Torch (2003), Patricia Finney's third novel in the Elizabethan spy thriller David Becket and Simon Ames Series. 
He is the main character in Robert Nye's historical novel The Voyage of the Destiny (1982)
 In The Loss of El Dorado: A Colonial History by V. S. Naipaul
Bob Newhart's monologue "Introducing Tobacco to Civilisation" takes the form of a telephone conversation between "Nutty Walt" Raleigh and a sceptical business associate.

Music
John Lennon of The Beatles describes Raleigh as "a stupid git" due to his popularization of smoking in the song "I'm So Tired" on  The White Album (1968).
 Raleigh is mentioned in the second "commercial" on P. D. Q. Bach's Report from Hoople: P. D. Q. Bach on the Air (1967), and credited with providing the composer with a recipe for a special blend of tobacco that will "give no end of reason to be jolly".

Operas
Raleigh is a main character in Edward German's comic opera Merrie England (1902);
 Raleigh appears as a character in Benjamin Britten's opera Gloriana, Op. 53 (1953).

Stage plays
In the late 1940s to early 1950s, actor and comedian Andy Griffith appeared as Sir Walter Raleigh, alongside other cast members in the stage play The Lost Colony.

Television
Simon Jones portrayed Raleigh in the Potato (1986) episode  of the BBC sitcom Blackadder II. 
Ronald Pickup portrayed Raleigh in the TV film My Friend Walter (1992).
Simon Farnaby / Mathew Baynton portrayed Raleigh in the educational comedy TV series Horrible Histories.

Locations
Raleigh, North Carolina is the capital of the American State of North Carolina, one of the original Thirteen Colonies. The city was named in honour of Sir Walter Raleigh.
Raleigh County, West Virginia is named after Sir Walter Raleigh. Alfred Beckley, the founder of the Raleigh county seat, said he did it to honour Raleigh for "the "enterprising and far-seeing patron of the earliest attempts to colonize our old Mother State of Virginia."

Brands and enterprises
Raleigh Cigarettes were a popular brand during the 1950s and 1960s  as was Sir Walter Raleigh Tobacco during the 20th century.
The gimmick of Raleigh premium coupons, free with each purchase, led comedian Alan King to say that after accumulating enough of them, one could acquire an iron lung.

Myths
Raleigh allegedly laid his cloak over a puddle so Queen Elizabeth I would not get her feet wet. The story is generally considered to be apocryphal.

References